D.A.D. Special is a compilation album by the Danish rock group D-A-D. The compilation was released on 1 December 1989 in Sweden, Norway, Denmark and Finland only.
It contains tracks from the group's two first albums, Call of the Wild and D.A.D. Draws a Circle, and also form their debut EP Standin' on the Never Never.

Track listing

Personnel
Adapted from the original albums' liner notes.
D-A-D
Jesper Binzer – vocals, guitar, banjo
Stig Pedersen – vocals, bass
Jacob Binzer – guitar, lap steel, electric piano, keyboards, backing vocals
Peter L. Jensen – drums, percussion, backing vocals
Technical
Frank Marstokk – producer (tracks 2, 4, 5, 7, 9, 12, 13, 14)
Mark Dearnley – producer (tracks 1, 3, 8, 10, 11)
Carsten Beck – cover design
D-A-D – cover design

References

External links
 This album on D-A-D's official homepage

1989 compilation albums
D.A.D. (band) albums